The Swallow was a sailing event on the Sailing at the 1948 Summer Olympics program in Torbay. Seven races were scheduled. 38 sailors, on 14 boats, from 14 nations competed.

Results 

DNF = Did Not Finish, DNS= Did Not Start, DSQ = Disqualified 
 = Male,  = Female

Daily standings

Courses at Torbay 
A total of three race area's was positioned by the Royal Navy in Torbay. Each of the classes was using the same kind of course and the same scoring system.

Notes

References 
 
 
 

Dragon
Swallow (keelboat)